Helmut is a German name. Variants include Hellmut, Helmuth, and Hellmuth.

From old German, the first element deriving from either heil ("healthy") or hiltja ("battle"), and the second from muot ("spirit, mind, mood").

Helmut may refer to:

People

A–L
Helmut Angula (born 1945), Namibian politician
Helmut Ashley (1919–2021), Austrian director and cinematographer
Helmut Bakaitis (born 1944), Australian director and actor
Helmut Berger (born 1944), Austrian actor
Helmut Dantine (1917–1982), Austrian actor
Helmut Deutsch (born 1945), Austrian classical pianist
Helmut Ditsch (born 1962), Argentine painter
Hellmut Diwald (1924–1993), German historian
Helmut Donner (born 1941), Austrian high jumper
Helmut Fischer (1926–1997), German actor
Hellmut von Gerlach (1866–1935), German journalist
Helmut Goebbels (1935–1945), only son of Joseph Goebbels 
Helmut Griem (1932–2004), German actor
Helmut Gröttrup (1916–1981), German rocket scientist
Helmut Haller (1939–2012), German football player
Helmut Hasse (1898–1979), German mathematician
Hellmut Hattler (born 1952), German musician
Helmut Haussmann (born 1943), German academic and politician
Helmut Hirsch (born 1916) German student executed for opposing the Nazi government
Helmut Jahn (1940–2021), German-born American architect
Helmut Kohl (1930–2017), German politician
Helmut Köllen (1950–1977), German musician
Helmut Krieger (born 1958), Polish shot putter
Helmut Lachenmann (born 1935), German composer
Helmut Landsberg (1906–1985), German scientist
Helmut Lang (artist) (born 1956), German fashion designer
Helmut Lemke (1907–1990), German politician
Helmut Lotti (born 1969), Belgian singer

M–Z
Helmut Marko (born 1943), Austrian racing driver
Helmut Newton (1920–2004), German-born Australian photographer
Helmut Norpoth (born 1943), German-born political scientist 
Helmut Oberlander (born 1924), Ukrainian former Canadian who was a member of the Einsatzgruppen death squads of Nazi Germany in the occupied Soviet Union during World War II
Helmut Rahn (1929–2003), German football player
Helmut Rohde (1925-2016), German politician
Helmut Schelsky (1912–1984), German sociologist
Helmut Schmidt (1918–2015), German politician, chancellor
Helmut Schoeck (1922–1993), Austrian sociologist
Helmut Schön (1915–1996), German football player and manager
Helmut Sick (1910–1991), Brazilian ornithologist
Helmut Sonnenfeldt (1926–2012), American foreign policy expert
Helmut Vetter (1910–1949), German Nazi SS officer at Auschwitz concentration camp executed for war crimes
Helmut Walcha (1907–1991), German organist
Helmut Zahn (1916–2004), German chemist
Helmut Zilk (1927–2008), Austrian politician
Cacau (born 1981), German-Brazilian football player, nicknamed Helmut

Fictional characters
Helmut Grokenberger, fictional character in the 1991 film Night on Earth
Iron Cross (Helmut Gruler), fictional character in the Marvel Comics universe
Baron Helmut Zemo, fictional character in the Marvel Comics universe
Helmut Heindenburg, fictional character in 1996 Colombian telenovela Guajira
Helmut, fictional character in the video game Road Rash
Helmut Kruger, fictional fashion model in the video game Hitman (2016)
Baron Helmut Schnitzelnazi, from the comedy skit Key & Peele
Helmut Spargle, a character from Futurama

See also
Hellmuth
Helmuth

References

German masculine given names